Oscar Grönberg (born 19 April 1987, in Sweden), is a Swedish/Norwegian jazz musician (piano) based in Trondheim, Norway, known as bandleader of his own O. G. Trio/O. G. Quartet and for his contributions in bands like Hanna Paulsberg Concept.

Career
Grönberg is a graduate of the Jazz program at Trondheim Musikkonsevatorium in 2011, where he joined the Hanna Paulsberg Concept.

O. G. Trio, including Trygve Waldemar Fiske (double bass) and Tomas Järmyr (drums), is a new, young, creative, exciting and fearless trio that played its debut concert in 2009. Together they create a world of groove, improvisation, humor and playful interaction, all based on Grönberg's subtle and original compositions. The trio is at the same time deeply respectful of the compositions, but also irreverent and free in their interactions over the well-established and endangered species line. The music is inspired by the likes of Thelonious Monk, Ahmad Jamal and Andrew Hill.

Discography

Within Friends & Neighbors
2011: No Beat Policy (Øra Fonogram)

Within Hanna Paulsberg Concept
2012: Waltz For Lilli (Øra Fonogram)
2014: Song For Josia (Øra Fonogram), including Trygve Waldemar Fiske & Hans Hulbækmo

With Doffs Poi
2012: Doffs Poi 
2017: Dictionary Songs (Vilje - Record Label)

With The Maxx
2015: Master Blaster (Mindblast Records)

References

External links

Avant-garde jazz musicians
Swedish jazz pianists
Swedish jazz composers
Male jazz composers
Norwegian University of Science and Technology alumni
1987 births
Living people
Musicians from Trondheim
Male pianists
21st-century pianists
21st-century Swedish male musicians